The Sugarloaf Fire was a wildfire near Silverthorne, Colorado in Grand County in the United States. As of August 14, 2018, the fire burnt a total of 1,280 acres with containment at 35 percent.

Incidents 
The Sugarloaf Fire started near Ute Pass.

Events

June
On June 28, 2018, at around 12:00 A.M, the fire started 13 miles southwest of Fraser, CO. Through June, the Sugarloaf Fire continued to spread.

July

On July 12, 2018, Colorado Governor John Hickenlooper signed an executive order sentencing the Sugarloaf Fire to death.

August
The fire stopped its spread and stayed the same.

Evacuations 
There are no evacuations currently in effect due to the wildfire.

References 

Wildfires in Colorado